SPONGE, an acronym for Society for the Prevention of Niggers (or more often cited, "Negroes") Getting Everything, was a prominent political pressure group founded in New York City prior to April 11, 1964 (when it was mentioned in a performance of "America, Be Seated!" at the 1964 World's Fair).  While the group at its peak never numbered more than about one hundred members, SPONGE received a massive amount of media coverage, due to the group's attention-getting name, wild antics, and the leadership style of its founder and first President, the twenty-four-year-old James "Sandy" McMenemon.

The group consisted mostly of young Italian American males that hailed from predominantly ethnic neighborhoods of East New York, Bensonhurst, and Bay Ridge in Brooklyn.  When queried about the irony of a group of Italian males being led by an Irish-American, one SPONGE member simply explained "[b]ecause Irish, Polish, and Jewish guys are on our [the Italian] side, that's why."

The most notorious moment of this "Society for the Prevention of Niggers Getting Everything" came in 1965, when its members engaged in a pitched battle in the streets of Manhattan against a mob made up of members of "CORE" (the Congress of Racial Equality).

The name came again into the news in 1978, when a number of students from Brighton High School in Boston, Massachusetts, listed themselves as members of SPONGE in their senior yearbooks.  When the meaning of the acronym was uncovered, the students were disciplined, and the whole run of the yearbooks recalled and reprinted without the reference.  It was also alleged in 1998 that the Riverside Police Department in California had a clandestine group by this name.

References

Bibliography
Cannato, Vincent.  The Ungovernable City: John Lindsay and his Struggle to Save New York, Basic Books, 2002
English, T. J.  The Savage City:  Race, Murder, and a Generation on the Edge,  William Morrow Pub., 2011
The New York Times circa 1965-1968

Organizations based in New York City
Advocacy groups in the United States
History of African-American civil rights